Albert James Connors (September 13, 1891 – October 26, 1948) was a member of the Wisconsin State Senate.

Biography
Connors was born on September 13, 1891, in Duluth, Minnesota. During World War I, he served in the United States Army. He was a member of the American Legion and the Veterans of Foreign Wars.

Political career
Connors defeated John Anderson in the primary election and then won the general election, serving as a member of the Senate from 1939 to 1942. Previously, he was District Attorney of Barron County, Wisconsin, in 1929. Additionally, he was a delegate to the 1932 Republican National Convention. While in the Senate, Connors was affiliated with the Wisconsin Progressive Party.

Connors died at his home in Rice Lake, Wisconsin, from a heart attack, at the age of 57.

References

External links
 The Political Graveyard

1891 births
1948 deaths
Politicians from Duluth, Minnesota
People from Barron County, Wisconsin
Military personnel from Wisconsin
United States Army personnel of World War I
Republican Party Wisconsin state senators
Wisconsin lawyers
Wisconsin Progressives (1924)
20th-century American politicians
20th-century American lawyers